Malla Malmivaara (born 10 December 1982) is a Finnish actress and singer. She appeared in more than twenty films since 2005.

Selected filmography

Partial discography

Albums 
 Can't Whistle When You Smile (as Belle Who, 2009)
 Malla (as Malla, 2021)
 Fresko (as Malla, 2023)

References

External links 

1982 births
Living people
Finnish film actresses
21st-century Finnish women singers
Actresses from Helsinki
Singers from Helsinki